

Origin 
Camaj is an Albanian surname that traces its origin to the brotherhood of the same name from the village Traboin, in Hoti, a region divided between Albania and Montenegro. The Camaj brotherhood are descendants of Pjetër Gega who in oral tradition was the founder of Traboin.  

Today, all inhabitants in the village of Vuksanlekaj, near Tuzi, Montenegro, are Camaj. 

Before static surnames were required by the government, an individual would use their father's name as their last name, or they would use their father's name as their middle name and their grandfather's name as their last name. Today, it is still common for those of the Camaj family to make their children's middle names the first name of their father.

The -aj suffix means “of the” or “son of” so Camaj means “son of Cama” or “of the Cama” and Cama was likely an ancestor of the Hoti tribe before static surnames were adopted.

The "Cama" in Camaj could be in reference to the Cama Pepa in this Hoti Tribe family tree, below,

Theories 
It is unclear what the name Cama means. Some say the name Cama comes from the old personal name or nickname Camë (definite form Cama) based on a shortened form of the vocabulary word camërdhok ‘little boy,’ however, google translate shows that camërdhok translates to chameleon. This seems to be unproven, at this time.

Additionally, when asked what the surname "Camaj" means, ChatGPT replies that it could be derived from the word "cama," which means "hill" or "mountain" and that it could be that Camaj refers to someone from a place on a hill or mountain. This seems to be unproven, at this time.

Notable People 
The surname may refer to:

 Aljbino Camaj (born 1979), Malsor Footballer
 Driton Camaj (born 1997), Malsor professional footballer
 Martin Camaj (1925–1992), Malsor folklorist, linguist, and writer
 Ardijan Camaj  (born 1983)
Malsore Kick Boxer and taekwondo second Degree black belt
 Simon Camaj aka siki (Born June 22 1988 ) Malsore MMA fighter, former all Michigan Football player 

Albanian-language surnames